João Pedro Pais (born in September) is a singer and musician from Portugal.

Discography 
 Segredos (1997)
 Outra Vez (1999)
 Falar por Sinais (2001)
 Tudo Bem (2004)
 Lado a Lado with Mafalda Veiga (2006)
 A Palma e a Mão (2008)
 O Coliseu (2010)
 Desassossego (2012)
 Identidade (2015)
 20 Anos (2017)
 Confidências (de um homem vulgar) (2019)

External links
Official site 

1971 births
Living people
21st-century Portuguese male singers
20th-century Portuguese male singers
Golden Globes (Portugal) winners